South Bougainville District is a district of the Autonomous Region of Bougainville of Papua New Guinea. Its capital is Buin. South Bougainville languages are spoken in the district.

References

Districts of Papua New Guinea
Autonomous Region of Bougainville